Amir Falahen (born 15 March 1993) is a German professional footballer who plays as a forward.

Career
Falahen came to Freiburg in 2009 after playing for SV Hochdorf and PTSV Jahn Freiburg in his youth. With the Freiburg junior team he  the DFB-Junioren-Vereinspokal in 2011 and 2012. In the 2012–13 season he moved up into Freiburg's second team and scored 18 goals in the 2013–14 season, when the team finished as runners-up. In July 2014, Falahen picked up a cruciate ligament injury during a friendly match with the first team and was sidelined for more than half a year. After his return in March 2015, he scored five goals in 11 matches. In the 2015–16 season Falahen received a professional contract with SC Freiburg, and on 5 February 2016, during a 0–2 defeat to VfL Bochum, Falahen made his debut in the 2. Bundesliga as a substitute. This made Falahen the first Palestinian who ever played in the 2. Bundesliga.

Personal life
Born in Germany, Falahen is of Palestinian descent.

References

External links
 

1993 births
Living people
German footballers
German people of Palestinian descent
Association football forwards
SC Freiburg II players
SC Freiburg players
SC Fortuna Köln players
Fortuna Düsseldorf II players
Bahlinger SC players
2. Bundesliga players
3. Liga players
Regionalliga players
Sportspeople from Freiburg im Breisgau
Footballers from Baden-Württemberg